HP Essential line is a line of entry-level, inexpensive laptops with basic functionality.

Current lines
HP Laptop - 17t (Intel)
HP Laptop - 17z (AMD)
HP Laptop - 15t (Intel)
HP Laptop - 15z (AMD)
HP Laptop - 14t (Intel)
HP Laptop - 14z (AMD)

Earlier models

The HP 635 Notebook

The HP 620 Notebook

The HP 520 Notebook is a low-end business laptop made by Hewlett-Packard. It runs either Core Duo T2400 or other Celeron M processors. It can come with Vista Business, Basic preinstalled, or if chosen, Red Hat 10.

The HP 450 Notebook

The HP 255 Notebook
Is a budget laptop.

HP Stream series

HP Stream is a line of low-end consumer-oriented laptops and tablets.

Models

Laptops

HP Stream 10

HP Stream 11

HP Stream 11 Pro

G1
G2
G3
G4
G5

HP Stream 13

HP Stream 14

2020's version

HP Stream 14 Pro

HP Stream x360

Tablets

HP Stream 7

The HP Stream 7 is a tablet computer designed by Hewlett-Packard that runs the Microsoft Corporation's Windows operating system. It was announced on September 29, 2014.

HP Stream 8

The HP Stream 8 is a tablet computer designed by Hewlett-Packard that runs the Microsoft Corporation's Windows operating system.

See also

HP Slate

References 

HP laptops